Andhra Pradesh Forest Department is one of the administrative divisions of Government of Andhra Pradesh. It is headed by the Principal Chief Conservator of Forests, Head of Forest Force. The primary function of this department is protection, conservation and management of forests in the Andhra Pradesh State. The Forest Department is organized into 12 territorial circles and 43 divisions. In addition, one Senior Officer of the rank of Deputy Conservator of Forests functions as Planning and Extension Officer in each district.

Flora and fauna
Andhra Pradesh State is bestowed with two mighty river systems of Krishna and Godavari. The State has wide and varied vegetation types enriched by a variety of flora and fauna. Andhra Pradesh being located strategically in the central region of the Indian sub-continent has representatives of the magnificent Indian plant and animal life. Its varied topography ranging from the hills of Eastern Ghats and Nallamallas to the shores of Bay of Bengal supports varied ecotypes, which in turn support a rich diversity of flora & fauna. The forests in the state can broadly be divided into four major biotic provinces.

1) Deccan Plateau - 53%

2) Central Plateau - 35%

3) Eastern Highland -11%

4) East Coastal Plains - 1%

The vegetation found in the state is largely of dry deciduous type with a mixture of Teak, and species of the genera Terminalia, Dalbergia, Pterocarpus, Anogeissus etc. The hills of Eastern Ghats add greatly to the Biological Diversity and provide centers of endemism for plants, birds and lesser forms of animal life. The varied habitat harbors a diversity of fauna which includes Tiger, Panther, Wolf, Wild Dog, Hyena, Sloth Bear, Gaur, Black Buck, Chinkara, Chowsingha, Nilgai, Cheetal, Sambar and a number of Birds and Reptiles. The long sea coast provides the nesting ground for sea turtles, the back water of Pulicat lake are the feeding grounds for Flamingo & Grey Pelican, the estuaries of river Godavari and Krishna support rich mangrove forests with Fishing Cat and Otters as key stone species.

The state is a proud possessor of some rare and endemic plants like Cycas beddomei, Pterocarpus santalinus, Terminalia pallida, Syzygium alternifolium, Shorea talura, Shorea tumburgia, Psilotum nudum etc. Among its rich fauna, the Double Banded or the Jerdon’s courser, the golden gecko, and the gray slender loris are some of the rare and endemic fauna of the state.

Protected areas
Andhra Pradesh has a network of 13 sanctuaries and 1 national park in the state. There are 2 zoo parks established in the state.

References

External links
 Andhra Pradesh Forest Department

State agencies of Andhra Pradesh
Environment of Andhra Pradesh
State forest departments of India
Forest Department
Year of establishment missing